Puzzle Quest: Challenge of the Warlords is a game developed by Australian company Infinite Interactive and published by D3 Publisher. The game combines role-playing with tile-matching elements. Taking place in a high fantasy setting, the player moves his or her character around the game's world and encounters monsters and other enemies to fight so as to gain experience and acquire treasure as in a typical role-playing game. Combat takes place on a board similar to Bejeweled, and by making matches of colored gems, the combatants can cause damage to their opponents, cast spells, or perform other abilities that affect the flow of the game.

The game was first released on the Nintendo DS and PlayStation Portable in 2007, and has since been ported to Microsoft Windows, OS X, Xbox 360, PlayStation 2, PlayStation 3, Wii, iOS, and Nintendo Switch. Among these ports included extended content: "Revenge of the Plague Lord" which was included in the Xbox 360, PlayStation 3, and iOS releases, and "Attack of the Golem Lord", which is available alongside the "Revenge" content for the Switch version, under the name Puzzle Quest: The Legend Returns.

Puzzle Quest was a surprise hit at release and received generally positive reviews for the fusion of the two distinct video game genres. Since its release, Puzzle Quest has received a direct sequel, Puzzle Quest 2, and a science-fiction variant, Puzzle Quest: Galactrix. The basic gameplay has also been used as a template for licensed games in the series, Marvel Puzzle Quest and Magic: The Gathering – Puzzle Quest.

Gameplay

The story of Puzzle Quest is based in the Warlords game universe. Players assume the role of a character with various statistics such as combat ability, morale, and magical affinity.  A character's predisposition toward individual attributes and spells is determined by the selection of one of four professions at the start of the game.  During play, the player takes on quests as part of the main storyline, as well as accepting side quests in order to gain items, experience and gold.  Gold can be used to buy equipment that offers bonuses in combat, or it can be used to build up a citadel that unlocks additional content and customization for the character.

The game uses a simple map, and as players accept quests, new towns, cities, and other points of interest appear as available destinations.  Each location is connected together by roads, and foes periodically appear between locations, blocking movement until they are defeated.  Key quest locations are also marked on the map, and completing quests typically involves visiting such locations in order to defeat one or more opponents in one-on-one battles.

Combat

Combat in the title is conducted entirely via turn-based puzzle action similar to Bejeweled or Zoo Keeper.  The player and the computer-controlled opponent take turns swapping the position of two horizontally or vertically adjacent tiles on a grid to make a row or column of at least 3 like tiles; these tiles are removed with various effects as listed below, and all tiles above them fall to fill in the spaces, with new tiles created at the top of the board.  If, by this action, a new row or column of three or more like tiles is formed, this is also removed and the chain can continue indefinitely.  An extremely long chain can earn the player additional bonuses. If either combatant can match four or more tiles in a line, that combatant will be given an extra turn and potentially additional bonuses. If no move to make a match of 3 is available, the board is reset for both combatants.

Tiles themselves correspond to certain effects when matched. Colored titles provide that color of mana for the combatant's spells and abilities, while skull tiles do direct damage to the opponent. Other tiles represent experience and gold for the player when matched. Additionally, wildcards can be matched with any of these tiles. The player-character's class, experience level, and equipment affect how much bonus mana or damage he or she gets for matching those tiles. Prior to a match, a combatant can cast a spell which he or she has enough mana for. Spells can do direct damage or may affect the board, such as removing all tiles of a specific type; once used, a spell has a cooldown period of a few turns before it can be used again. Combatants may have armor points, either from their equipment or gained through spells, which absorb damage before the combatant's hit points are reduced. Once either the player or computer opponent runs out of life, the battle is over.  Most battles can be re-fought if the player loses, although only those which are part of the main quest need be completed in order to advance the game plot.

Following successful battle, the player is rewarded with experience points and gold. By raising the character's experience level, the player can distribute skill points to affect how the tile-matching combat plays out. Gold can be used to purchase equipment and spells at the in-game shops. The player can gain Companions during the game. Companions, like equipment, provide certain bonuses in combat, and also affect the storyline of the game. Between battles, a player can visit his or her citadel, a certain base which he or she can build up using gold and other treasures. This provides a forge to construct new equipment, a bestiary where the player can try to learn spells from captured opponents, and train mounts. Most of these activities require completing a mini-game variant of the tile-matching game.

Development
Puzzle Quest was primarily the brainchild of Steve Fawkner, the original designer of the Warlords game series which merged typical RPG elements with turn-based strategy games. The series was successful enough for Fawkner to form Infinite Interactive, which were the primary developers of the first three titles for the series, and did some of the work on the fourth title in 2004 before full development was taken over by Strategic Studies Group (SSG), the publisher for the first three games, due to declining budgets for video games at that time. Fawkner opted to reduce his staffing to three people and use the time to refine their game engines, not releasing any games through 2007.

During this time, Fawkner became hooked on Bejeweled, often playing the game into the late hours of the night. He realized that he could wrap the core match-3 concept into a game with Magic: The Gathering elements and create a story mode in the vein of Final Fantasy Tactics, forming the basis for Puzzle Quest. Fawkner found difficulty in finding a publisher for the title, as they did not have an idea of how many units the game would sell and thus could not estimate a budget for the title. Fawkner eventually was able to gain D3 Publisher that dealt primarily in low-volume Japanese titles, though there still had difficulties with estimating budgets.

The first release of the game in North America consisted of 40,000 units of the Nintendo DS version; according to Fawkner these sold out within a week of shipment, in part due to the game's mention and difficulty to acquire by the popular webcomic Penny Arcade. D3 raced to publish more to meet demand, though at the time were limited by Nintendo's ability to provide black DS cartridges. With the success of the game, Fawkner was able to expand Infinite Interactive to eventually 70 employees to work on the various ports of Puzzle Quest and subsequent sequels.

Version differences
A side-by-side comparison of the DS and PSP versions by Kotaku noted that the PSP version has a much more challenging artificial intelligence along with a larger screen and more in-game effects. However, the PSP version also has a bug relating to in-game companions that is not present in the DS version; the companions' stated special abilities do not work. While game designer Steve Fawkner has acknowledged this bug, he claims that only Vicious Cycle, the port developer, has the ability to produce a patch. The PSN and European version of the game do not have the bug.

Xbox Live release
In addition to releases for the PlayStation 2 and Wii consoles, the game was ported to Xbox Live Arcade, using the service's built-in networking to allow players to compete online similar to the player matches available in the DS and PSP versions.

Nintendo 
An updated version of Puzzle Quest, adding in an additional quest line Attack of the Golem Lord atop the existing content. The title, named Puzzle Quest: The Legend Returns, was released on 19 September 2019.

Expansion
An expansion for the game, Revenge of the Plague Lord, was released on 23 July, 2008 for the Xbox Live Arcade and was included in the 9 October 2008 release on the PlayStation Network. It was also released as a free update for the iPhone OS version. The expansion features 4 new character classes (Bard, Rogue, Ranger and Warlock), and an expansive new area on the Southern Map containing more than 25 challenging quests, 50 new spells, 40 new magical items and new monsters to combat, as part of the story of Antharg, the Lord of Plague and brother to Lord Bane.

Reception

Puzzle Quest was a giant surprise hit, receiving very positive reviews from the gaming community. IGN stated that the PSP version of the game "managed to combine the best aspects of both [puzzle and RPG] genres into one nice little package." Hyper'''s Maurice Branscombe commends the game for being a "fantastic puzzle game, mixed with simple, yet compelling, RPG elements". However, he criticizes it for having a "cookie cutter RPG story".

MTV Networks' GameTrailers awarded Puzzle Quest'' the title of "Best Puzzle/Parlor Game" of 2007. Future's Next Generation online ranked it as the 17th best game released in 2007. GameSpy awarded it "Best Xbox Live Arcade Game" of 2007. The Xbox Live Arcade version was listed as the 6th best title of all time for that platform by the IGN staff in a September 2010 compilation.

Notes

 The Nintendo DS version is known in Japan as 

 The PlayStation Portable version is known in Japan as

References

External links

 

1st Playable Productions games
2007 video games
Bandai Namco Entertainment franchises
D3 Publisher games
DSiWare games
Fantasy video games
IOS games
Lua (programming language)-scripted video games
MacOS games
Mobile games
Multiplayer and single-player video games
Nintendo DS games
Nintendo Switch games
PlayStation 2 games
PlayStation Network games
PlayStation Portable games
Puzzle Quest
Role-playing video games
Simple (video game series)
Tile-matching video games
Video games developed in Australia
Video games developed in the United States
Video games featuring protagonists of selectable gender
Video games with expansion packs
Warlords (video game series)
Wii games
Windows games
Xbox 360 Live Arcade games